Fekri Al-Hubaishi (born April 18, 1978 in Yemen) is a Yemeni football striker. He is a member of the Yemen national football team.

Career 

Fekri Al-Hubaishi started his career in Al Sha'ab Ibb, where he played 7 for seasons. After a short spell in Al-Saqr, he returned to his parent club Al Sha'ab Ibb. He achieved the title of league top scorer in 2009.

Honours

Club
Al-Sha'ab Ibb'

Yemeni League: 2
2002–03, 2003–04
Yemeni President Cup: 2
2002, 2003
Yemeni September 26 Cup: 1
2002

Al-Saqr'
Yemeni Unity Cup: 1
2008

External links 
 

1978 births
Living people
Yemeni footballers
Yemen international footballers
Association football forwards
Al Sha'ab Ibb players
Al-Saqr SC players
Al-Ittihad SCC (Ibb) players
Yemeni League players